This is a list of civil parishes in the ceremonial county of Derbyshire, England. There are 274 civil parishes. The districts are shown to the right and are numbered as follows:-
1 High Peak
2 Derbyshire Dales
3 South Derbyshire
4 Erewash
5 Amber Valley
6 North East Derbyshire
7 Chesterfield
8 Bolsover
9 Derby

Amber Valley
Part of the former Alfreton Urban District is unparished.

Aldercar and Langley Mill
Alderwasley
Alfreton (town)
Ashleyhay
Belper (town)
Codnor
Crich
Denby
Dethick, Lea and Holloway
Duffield
Hazelwood
Heanor and Loscoe (town)
Holbrook
Horsley
Horsley Woodhouse
Idridgehay and Alton
Ironville
Kedleston
Kilburn
Kirk Langley
Mackworth
Mapperley
Pentrich
Quarndon
Ravensdale Park
Ripley (town)
Shipley
Shottle and Postern
Smalley
Somercotes
South Wingfield
Swanwick
Turnditch
Weston Underwood
Windley

Bolsover
The whole of the district is parished.

Ault Hucknall
Barlborough
Blackwell
Clowne
Elmton with Creswell
Glapwell
Hodthorpe and Belph
Langwith
Old Bolsover (town)
Pinxton
Pleasley
Scarcliffe
Shirebrook (town)
South Normanton
Tibshelf
Whitwell

Chesterfield
The former Chesterfield Municipal Borough is unparished.

 Brimington
 Staveley (town)

Derby
The former Derby County Borough is unparished.

Derbyshire Dales
The whole of the district is parished.

Abney and Abney Grange
Aldwark
Alkmonton
Ashbourne (town)
Ashford in the Water
Atlow
Bakewell (town)
Ballidon
Baslow and Bubnell
Beeley
Biggin
Birchover
Blackwell in the Peak
Bonsall
Boylestone
Bradbourne
Bradley
Bradwell
Brailsford
Brassington
Brushfield
Callow
Calver
Carsington
Chatsworth
Chelmorton
Clifton and Compton
Cromford
Cubley
Curbar
Darley Dale (town)
Doveridge
Eaton and Alsop
Edensor
Edlaston and Wyaston
Elton
Eyam
Fenny Bentley
Flagg
Foolow
Frogatt
Gratton
Great Hucklow
Great Longstone
Grindleford
Grindlow
Harthill
Hartington Middle Quarter
Hartington Nether Quarter
Hartington Town Quarter
Hassop
Hathersage
Hazlebadge
Highlow
Hognaston
Hollington
Hopton
Hulland
Hulland Ward
Hungry Bentley
Ible
Ivonbrook Grange
Kirk Ireton
Kniveton
Lea Hall
Little Hucklow
Little Longstone
Litton
Longford
Mapleton
Marston Montgomery
Matlock Bath
Matlock Town (town)
Mercaston
Middleton
Middleton and Smerrill
Monyash
Nether Haddon
Newton Grange
Norbury and Roston
Northwood and Tinkersley
Offcote and Underwood
Offerton
Osmaston
Over Haddon
Parwich
Pilsley
Rodsley
Rowland
Rowsley
Sheldon
Shirley
Snelston
Somersal Herbert
South Darley
Stanton
Stoney Middleton
Sudbury
Taddington
Tansley
Thorpe
Tideswell
Tissington
Wardlow
Wheston
Winster
Wirksworth (town)
Yeaveley
Yeldersley
Youlgreave

Erewash
The former Ilkeston Municipal Borough and part of the former Long Eaton Urban District are unparished.

Breadsall
Breaston
Dale Abbey
Draycott and Church Wilne
Hopwell
Little Eaton
Morley
Ockbrook and Borrowash
Risley
Sandiacre
Sawley
Stanley and Stanley Common
Stanton by Dale
West Hallam

High Peak
The former Buxton Municipal Borough and Glossop Municipal Borough are unparished.

Aston
Bamford
Brough and Shatton
Castleton
Chapel-en-le-Frith
Charlesworth
Chinley, Buxworth and Brownside
Chisworth
Derwent
Edale
Green Fairfield
Hartington Upper Quarter
Hayfield
Hope
Hope Woodlands
King Sterndale
New Mills (town)
Peak Forest
Thornhill
Tintwistle
Whaley Bridge (town)
Wormhill

North East Derbyshire
The whole of the district is parished.

Ashover
Barlow
Brackenfield
Brampton
Calow
Clay Cross
Dronfield (town)
Eckington
Grassmoor, Hasland and Winsick
Heath and Holmewood
Holmesfield
Holymoorside and Walton
Killamarsh
Morton
North Wingfield
Pilsley
Shirland and Higham
Stretton
Sutton cum Duckmanton
Temple Normanton
Tupton
Unstone
Wessington
Wingerworth

South Derbyshire
The former Swadlincote Urban District is unparished.

Ash
Aston upon Trent
Barrow upon Trent
Barton Blount
Bearwardcote
Bretby
Burnaston
Calke
Castle Gresley
Catton
Cauldwell
Church Broughton
Church Gresley
Coton in the Elms
Dalbury Lees
Drakelow
Egginton
Elvaston
Etwall
Findern
Foremark
Foston and Scropton
Hartshorne
Hatton
Hilton
Hoon
Ingleby
Linton
Lullington
Marston on Dove
Melbourne
Netherseal
Newton Solney
Osleston and Thurvaston
Overseal
Radbourne
Repton
Rosliston
Shardlow and Great Wilne
Smisby
Stanton by Bridge
Stenson Fields
Sutton on the Hill
Swarkestone
Ticknall
Trusley
Twyford and Stenson
Walton upon Trent
Weston-on-Trent
Willington
Woodville

See also
 List of civil parishes in England
 List of places in Derbyshire

Notes

References

External links
 Office for National Statistics: Geographical Area Listings

Populated places in Derbyshire
Derbyshire
 
Derbyshire-related lists